Urima or Ourima, also known as Antiochia ad Euphratem and Arulis, was a town on the Euphrates River of Classical Anatolia, inhabited from Hellenistic to Byzantine times. It was in the late Roman province of Euphratensis. Urima was the seat of a bishop; no longer a residential bishopric, it remains a titular see of the Roman Catholic Church.

Its site is located near , in a now-submerged portion of Gaziantep Province in Asiatic Turkey.

References

Populated places in ancient Upper Mesopotamia
Former populated places in Turkey
Populated places of the Byzantine Empire
History of Gaziantep Province
Hellenistic colonies in Anatolia
Catholic titular sees in Asia